Amalia Molina (Seville, 1881 - Barcelona, July 8, 1956) was a popular Spanish tonadillera and dancer. Raised in Triana, she moved at a young age to Madrid, where she debuted at the age of 17. Her career took her to Latin America and even Broadway. In Paris she premiered in the opera, Goyescas. She starred in the film, Malvaloca (1926). She was married from 1904 to Trelles del Busto.

References

External links

 Obituary at ABC

1881 births
1956 deaths
People from Seville
Tonadilleras
Deaths from cancer in Spain
20th-century Spanish women singers
20th-century Spanish singers